Tír na nÓg is an otherworldly realm in Irish mythology.

Tír na nÓg may also refer to:

 Tír na nÓg (band), an Irish band founded in the early 1970s
 Tír na nÓg (album), the first album by Irish band Tír na nÓg
 Tir na n'Og, a Serbian band specializing in Irish folk music, renamed Alfapop in 2008
 Tir na n'Og (album), the first album by Serbian band Tir na n'Og
 "Tír na nÓg", a song by Celtic Woman from their 2016 album Celtic Woman: Destiny
 "Tir Nan Og", a song by Alcest from the 2007 album Souvenirs d'un autre monde
 "Tir Na Nog", a song by Van Morrison from the 1986 album No Guru, No Method, No Teacher
 Tir Na Nog (video game), a 1984 computer game
 Tir na n-Og Award, abbreviated TnaO, a set of annual children's literary awards in Wales from 1976
 Mystic Knights of Tir Na Nog, a live-action show from 1998 by Saban Entertainment
 "The Land-of-the-ever-Young" (Tir-nan-Og), a work for brass band by Granville Bantock